Proczki  is a settlement in the administrative district of Gmina Zabór, within Zielona Góra County, Lubusz Voivodeship, in western Poland.

The settlement has a population of 21.

Notable residents
 Rudolf Sieckenius (16 May 1896 – 28 April 1945), Wehrmacht general

References

Proczki